The Moscow Patriots are a professional American football team based in Moscow, Russia. The Patriots compete in the Eastern European Super League (EESL) as a member club of the Super League. Home games were played at Sapsan Arena.

History
The team has been established on October 3, 1999.

The team is the most decorated American football team in Russia. Since 2002, the Patriots has won 15 champion titles.

Season by season

LAF

Source: Enciclopedia del Football - A cura di Roberto Mezzetti

Achievements
Russian Championship / League of American Football
 Champions (15): 2002-2012, 2014, 2016, 2017, 2019
EFAF Eastern Cup
 Champions (1) 2010

References

External links
 

American football teams in Russia
American football teams established in 1999
1999 establishments in Russia
Sports clubs in Moscow